Final Girls is a 2017 thriller novel by Todd Ritter, writing under the penname Riley Sager.

Synopsis
Ten years ago, Quincy was a carefree college student who decided to join her friends in a camping vacation at Pinewood Cottage. The trip ended with a gruesome massacre, of which Quincy was the sole survivor. She was saved by Coop, the police officer, that responded to the scene, and Joe, an escaped mental patient who arrived at their camp is blamed for the murders. The press dubs Quincy a "final girl,” comparing her to two other final girls.  The first, Lisa, survived a sorority house massacre, and the second, Sam, was targeted by a serial killer known as the "Sack Man,” while working at a hotel. The media tried desperately to get the three women together for a television special, but Quincy refused.  She is contacted by Lisa, and the two begin communicating with each other, albeit very infrequently.  Lisa does not have a similar relationship with Sam. Years later, Quincy is barely holding herself together, as she finds it hard to trust anyone other than Coop and her boyfriend, Jeff. She is able to make a living of sorts via a cooking vlog but is unable to remember anything from the night of the massacre. Her fragile living situation is thrown into an upheaval when she learns that Lisa has killed herself, and Sam arrives at her home. Sam is determined to make Quincy remember what happened, as well as to come out of her shell, which puts Quincy on edge. She begins to question what actually happened that night, especially after Lisa's death is discovered to be a murder. 

Ultimately, it is revealed that Coop was the true murderer and disguised his murders by avoiding any one modus operandi. He maintained his presence in Quincy's life in order to ensure that she never remembered the events of that night, and he was careful to ensure that she avoid actually healing and moving on, as this would lessen his hold over her. Sam is also revealed to have been Joe's childhood friend, Tina, who approached Quincy in hopes of learning the truth, as she believed Quincy was the true murderer. The real Sam was murdered by Coop, who also killed Lisa. Coop turns on Quincy, after the two sleep together.  Quincy, however, is able to kill him instead. The book ends with Tina going to jail and Quincy breaking up with her boyfriend, as she tries to piece her life back together.

Development 
Ritter came up with the book's premise while watching Halloween on Halloween. He began to wonder what life would be like for a Final Girl years after the initial event, questioning "Do they think about it every day? Do they try to forget it? Can they ever truly trust anyone?". He briefly debated making it a YA novel, but decided against it.

Release
Final Girls was released under the penname of Riley Sager, a gender neutral name. In later press coverage of the novel and author, media outlets noted that the official author website lacked an author photo and did not use gender pronouns when discussing Sager. Ritter and his agent chose to do this because "since we were looking for a new publisher, one could argue that editors would be willing to go with someone who had a clean slate, rather than a critically acclaimed author with a spotty sales record."

Final Girls was first published in hardback and ebook format on July 11, 2017, through Dutton. An audiobook adaptation narrated by Erin Bennett was released simultaneously through Penguin Audio. The novel was released in paperback on January 23, 2018, also through Dutton.

Reception
Final Girls received praise from Stephen King, who called it “the first great thriller of 2017" and compared it favorably to Gone Girl. USA Today reviewed the book, stating that "It’s a page-turner with an intriguing premise, hampered only by bad writing and a general lack of literary merit."

Awards 
 International Thriller Writers Awards for Best Hard Cover Novel (won, 2018)

Adaptation
Plans for a film adaptation were announced in November 2017. Universal Pictures won the option rights for Final Girls and Nicole Clemens, Ashley Zalta, and Michael Sugar were attached as producers.

See also 
 The Final Girl Support Group, a 2021 novel with a similar premise

References

2017 American novels
American thriller novels
Novels by Riley Sager
E. P. Dutton books